Tigerdrottningen (Swedish for The Tiger Queen) is the eleventh studio album by Swedish alternative rock band Kent. It was released on 30 April 2014 by Sonet Records (Universal Music). The album was preceded by the lead single "La Belle Epoque" on 12 March 2014. "Var är vi nu?" was released as the album's second single on 24 July 2014. The music video was released on 21 May 2014. The third single "Mirage" was released on 3 September 2014, with an accompanying video released on the same date.

Lyrically, Tigerdrottningen is more politically charged than previous albums.

Promotion 
Three promotional singles were released from Tigerdrottningen through Spotify preceding the album's release: "Skogarna" on 25 April, "Godhet" on 26 April and "Din enda vän" on 27 April 2014.

Commercial performance 
Tigerdrottningen debuted at number one on the Swedish Albums Chart on the chart dated 9 May 2014, becoming Kent's tenth consecutive number-one album. The same week the album was certified gold for 20,000 copies sold. On the chart dated 5 June 2014, the album was certified platinum for 40,000 copies sold.

Track listing 

"Din enda vän" contains excerpts from Bonjour Tristesse.

Personnel 
Credits adapted from album liner notes.

Joakim Berg – composer, lyrics, vocals, backing vocals, keyboards, piano, programming,  guitar
Martin Sköld – composer (track 11), bass, keyboards, piano
Markus Mustonen – drums, percussion, backing vocals, keyboards, piano
Sami Sirviö – guitar, keyboards, programming
Kent – producers
Daniel Alexander – producer
Stefan Boman – producer, recording, mixer
Saska Becker – production assistant
Simon Sigfridsson – assistant engineer
Martin Brengesjö – instrument technician

Eric Eylands – studio assistant
Ted Jensen – mastering
Rudie Edwards – backing vocals (track 1, 2, 3, 5, 6)
Beatrice Eli – vocals (track 9), backing vocals (track 1, 2, 5, 6)
Petra Marklund – backing vocals (track 5, 6, 9, 10)
Camela Leierth – backing vocals (track 5, 6)
Erik Hassle – backing vocals (track 4)
Martin Sandberg – backing vocals (track 2)
Compton Gospel Choir (Yalonda Dancy, Talitha Manor, Katherine Dancy, and Angela Allen) – vocals (track 7)

Charts

Weekly charts

Year-end charts

Certifications

References 

2014 albums
Kent (band) albums
Swedish-language albums
Pop rock albums by Swedish artists